Cypripedium japonicum, known as the Japanese cypripedium and Korean lady's slipper, is a species of orchid. It is native to Japan, Korea and China (Anhui, Gansu, Guizhou, Hubei, Hunan, Jiangxi, Shaanxi, Sichuan, Zhejiang).

References

External links
 Cypripedium japonicum

japonicum
Orchids of Japan
Orchids of China
Orchids of Korea
Plants described in 1784